In the CONCACAF Fourth Round of qualification for the 2014 FIFA World Cup, the United States, Costa Rica, and Honduras finished in the top three places and qualified directly for the 2014 World Cup. Mexico finished in fourth place and defeated New Zealand in the CONCACAF – OFC play-off to gain a spot in the World Cup. Mexico finished in fourth place ahead of Panama after the United States scored two goals against Panama in stoppage time in the final match of qualifying; had Panama retained its 2–1 lead, they would have finished in fourth place and eliminated Mexico on goals scored, who had qualified for the previous five World Cups.

Format
The fourth round saw the three group winners and the three group runners-up from the third round compete in a single group of six teams. This stage is referred to as the Hexagonal or Hex, and has been used by CONCACAF to determine its World Cup finals entrants since the qualification tournament for the 1998 FIFA World Cup.

The matches were played from 6 February to 15 October 2013. The top three teams advanced to the World Cup finals tournament in Brazil, and the fourth-placed team advanced to a play-off against New Zealand, the winner of the Oceania qualifiers.

Qualified teams
The qualifiers for this round were determined by 16 October 2012.

Standings

Matches
The representative from the six national associations met together on 19 October 2012, but could not agree on the schedule for the fourth round. The draw for the fixtures was conducted by CONCACAF and FIFA on 7 November 2012, in Miami Beach, Florida.

Goalscorers
There were 63 goals scored in 30 games, for an average of 2.1 goals per game.
4 goals

 Jerry Bengtson
 Carlo Costly
 Jozy Altidore

3 goals

 Clint Dempsey
 Oribe Peralta
 Bryan Ruiz
 Luis Tejada

2 goals

 Celso Borges
 Álvaro Saborío
 Javier Hernández
 Luis Henríquez
 Gabriel Torres
 Eddie Johnson
 Graham Zusi

1 goal

 Jhonny Acosta
 Randall Brenes
 Diego Calvo
 Joel Campbell
 Roy Miller
 Michael Umaña
 Maynor Figueroa
 Juan Carlos García
 Óscar García
 Wilson Palacios
 Roger Rojas
 Jermaine Anderson
 Rodolph Austin
 Jermaine Beckford
 Marvin Elliott
 Raúl Jiménez
 Aldo de Nigris
 Roberto Chen
 Blas Pérez
 Román Torres
 Landon Donovan
 Brad Evans
 Aron Jóhannsson
 Michael Orozco

1 own goal
 Jorge Claros (against Jamaica)

Notes

References

External links
Results and schedule (FIFA.com version)
Results and schedule (CONCACAF.com version)

4
2013 in American soccer
qual
2012–13 in Mexican football
2013–14 in Mexican football
2012–13 in Costa Rican football
qual
2012–13 in Honduran football
qual
2012–13 in Jamaican football
2013–14 in Jamaican football
2012–13 in Panamanian football
2013–14 in Panamanian football
qualification 2